Symplocos kowalewskii is an extinct species of flowering plant known through a single flower preserved in amber. It belongs to the genus Symplocos within the family Symplocaceae.

Description 
The pentamerous flower of Symplocos kowalewskii is 25–28 mm wide. The corolla is fused basally, and the exterior surface bears trichomes. Most pollen grains are tricolporate.

Taxonomy
Within the genus Symplocos it may be placed in the subgenus Symplocos.

Ecology
Symplocos kowalewskii is thought to have occurred in ancient forested habitats, possibly in addition to Quasisequoia swamps. The extant, Asian relatives grow in montane, humid forests.

Temporal range 
The fossilized specimen dates back to the late Eocene.

Distribution 
The fossilized specimen originates from Baltic amber. It likely was found in the Samland Peninsula.

Scientific significance
The preserved specimen is unusually large. It is about three times as big as the usual preserved flowers found in amber, and this makes the preserved Symplocos kowalewskii specimen unique, as it is the largest known preserved flower in amber. The rarity of such specimens may be explained by the physical properties of the tree sap. Also, it is thought that larger specimens do not stick well to the sap. This fossil can help reconstruct the ancient flora and climate.

References

kowalewski
Prehistoric angiosperms